Dominique Montiel Byrd (born February 7, 1984) is a former American football tight end. He was drafted by the St. Louis Rams in the third round of the 2006 NFL Draft. He played college football at Southern California.

He was also a member of the Arizona Cardinals, Washington Redskins and the Seattle Seahawks.

Early years
Following his high school career at Breck School in Golden Valley, Minnesota, Byrd played in the 2002 U.S. Army All-American Bowl.

College career
Byrd went to Southern California where he made a 2004 All-Pac-10 honorable mention, and was best known for catching two one-handed touchdown passes, one of which was in the Orange Bowl victory against University of Oklahoma.

Professional career

Pre-draft

St. Louis Rams
Byrd was taken in the third round of the 2006 NFL Draft at pick #93 overall. He played 5 games in the 2006 season, catching 2 balls for 39 yards and one touchdown.

Arizona Cardinals
After spending the 2008 season out of football, Byrd was signed by the Arizona Cardinals on May 5, 2009. He was waived on November 24, 2009. On January 21, 2010, Byrd was re-signed to a future contract by the Cardinals. But his stay with the Cardinals ended on August 30, 2010, when he was released by the team.

Seattle Seahawks
On January 21, 2011, the Seahawks signed Byrd to a future contract. He was released on September 13.

Washington Redskins
On October 26, 2011 the Redskins signed Byrd to a 1-year deal as a backup to replace Chris Cooley, who was placed on injured reserve. He was waived on November 8. He re-signed for the Redskins, after Fred Davis was suspended on December 6. Byrd was released on December 20, 2011.

References

External links
Arizona Cardinals bio
USC Trojans bio

1984 births
Living people
Players of American football from Minneapolis
American football tight ends
USC Trojans football players
St. Louis Rams players
Arizona Cardinals players
Seattle Seahawks players
Washington Redskins players